Alalay Municipality is the third municipal section of the Mizque Province in the Cochabamba Department, Bolivia. Its seat is Alalay.

Geography 
Some of the highest mountains of the municipality are listed below:

Languages 
The languages spoken in the Alalay Municipality are mainly Quechua and Spanish.

References 

 Instituto Nacional de Estadistica de Bolivia

Municipalities of the Cochabamba Department